Bal Viray David Jr. (born August 23, 1972) is a Filipino professional basketball coach and former player. He played his whole 10-year career for the Barangay Ginebra Kings of the Philippine Basketball Association (PBA). He last coached the UST Growling Tigers of the University Athletic Association of the Philippines (UAAP).

Amateur career
David was a standout for the University of Santo Tomas (UST), leading the Growling Tigers to the 1994 UAAP men's basketball championship. His field-goal at the dying seconds of Game 3 allowed the Tigers to defeat the De La Salle Green Archers 2–1 in the championship series.

David also participated in the amateur Philippine Basketball League playing for Stag Pale Pilseners. Stag won several championships, the last of which was in 1997 where they won the Danny Floro Cup. David had three steals in the deciding game that gave Stag the championship.

Professional career
David signed up for the Ginebra San Miguel, where he was joined by Stag teammate Marlou Aquino who was picked first overall by Ginebra in the 1996 PBA Draft.

In the 1996 Commissioner's Cup, Ginebra barged into the semifinals, facing the Shell Turbo Chargers. In the series that went into the deciding game, David converted a three-point field goal to break the 83-all deadlock. However, Richie Ticzon scored his own three-pointer for Shell; in the ensuing play Kenny Redfield blocked Vince Hizon's shot, which led to Redfield's three-pointer to eliminate Ginebra from contention. Ginebra, now sporting the team name Gordon's Gin Boars, David entered the 1997 Commissioner's Cup Finals against the Alaska Milkmen; the Boars won over the Milkmen in six games, with the title-clinching Game 6 won via a 105–79 rout.

In the 1999 PBA All-Filipino Cup quarterfinals, he made an off-balance game-winner shot against Asi Taulava-led Mobiline Phone Pals which was one of the biggest upsets in the history of PBA. However, the team was defeated by Formula Shell in the semifinals.

Coaching career 
David was hired as his alma mater's head coach in 2022.

Coaching record

Collegiate career

References

1972 births
Living people
Barangay Ginebra San Miguel players
Filipino men's basketball players
Philippine Basketball Association All-Stars
Point guards
Basketball players from Quezon City
UST Growling Tigers basketball players
Pop Cola Panthers draft picks
UST Growling Tigers basketball coaches